Der rote Kreis (German: The Crimson Circle) may refer to:

 The Crimson Circle (1929 film)
 The Crimson Circle (1960 film)